Tressange (Lorraine Franconian Träisséng/Dreschéng)  is a commune in the Moselle department in Grand Est in north-eastern France.
It is 7 km from the border to Luxembourg.

See also
 Communes of the Moselle department

References

External links

 https://en.cartes-2-france.com/villes/57678-tressange.php

Communes of Moselle (department)